This is a list of the National Register of Historic Places listings in Pasadena, California.

This is intended to be a complete list of the properties and districts on the National Register of Historic Places in the city of Pasadena, California, United States. The locations of National Register properties and districts for which the latitude and longitude coordinates are included below, may be seen in an online map.

There are more than 500 properties and districts listed on the National Register in the county, including 21 National Historic Landmarks.  Pasadena is the location of 128 of these properties and districts, including 5 National Historic Landmarks; they are listed here. The other properties and districts elsewhere in the county, including 5 National Historic Landmarks, are listed separately.  A single district, the Arroyo Seco Parkway Historic District, is split between Pasadena and other parts of the county.

The first sites in Pasadena to be listed on the Register were Greene and Greene's American Craftsman masterpiece, the Gamble House (built from 1908 to 1909), the Pasadena Playhouse (built in 1924) and Frank Lloyd Wright's textile block structure, the Millard House (built in 1923). Perhaps most famous for hosting the annual football game at the Rose Bowl, Pasadena was also a center of architectural innovation in the early 20th century as Greene and Greene built their innovative Craftsman-style bungalow houses and larger-scale ultimate bungalows throughout Pasadena, including the Gamble House, Robert R. Blacker House, Dr. W. T. Bolton House and Cordelia A. Culbertson House. Other architects of note who have designed buildings in Pasadena include Myron Hunt (Rose Bowl and California Institute of Technology) and Welton Beckett (Bullock's Pasadena).

Pasadena is the home of many leading scientific and cultural institutions, including the California Institute of Technology (Caltech), the Jet Propulsion Laboratory, the Pasadena Playhouse and the Norton Simon Museum of Art. Several sites relate to Pasadena's long connection with astronomy and space exploration, including the Space Flight Operations Facility, the Twenty-Five-Foot Space Simulator, and Hale Solar Laboratory. Also, the Edwin Hubble House, home to famed astronomer Edwin Hubble, is located in the adjacent community of San Marino.

Two of Pasadena's historic bridges, the Colorado Street Bridge, built in 1913 and known for its distinctive Beaux Arts arches, light standards, and railings, and the La Loma Bridge, built in 1914, are among the sites listed on the Register.

Thirty-one of Pasadena's listings are historic districts, which include multiple contributing properties. Among these historic districts is Old Town Pasadena, a thriving historic district of shops, bars and restaurants in well-preserved turn-of-the-century buildings with its center at Fair Oaks Avenue and Colorado Boulevard. Other historic districts include the Pasadena Playhouse Historic District, the Pasadena Civic Center District, the Bungalow Heaven Landmark District, the Civic Center Financial District, the Lower Arroyo Seco Historic District, the Orange Heights-Barnhart Tracts Historic District, the Park Place-Arroyo Terrace Historic District, the Prospect Historic District and the South Marengo Historic District.

Current listings

|}

Former listing

|}

See also

List of National Historic Landmarks in California
National Register of Historic Places listings in California
California Historical Landmarks in Los Angeles County, California

References

 
Pasadena
Pasadena, California